Ami Aaj Nasto Hoye Jai is a 2013 Bengali film.

Plot 
The film commences as a photographer finds an unconscious girl on a sea beach. The girl is introduced as Mayurakshi (Piyali), who was trying to get herself over a dark past. The photographer tried to disentangle the mysteries of Mayurakshi's past, so that he can help her in returning to normal life.

It was revealed that the girl had a family consisting of her parents, her brother and sister and her fiancé. But everything gets spoiled with the death of Mayurakshi's mother. Aru, her brother, gets into bad company and involves himself in a smuggling business and finally, gets shot. Later, her father dies with a heart attack after losing his job. Mayurakshi get into a deep situation of financial crisis with unpaid debts. To overcome this, she finally decides to involve herself in a destructive plan, made by her evil fried Ujan (Swaraj), who was a journalist by profession. However, this incident only adds fuel to the flame. Mayurakshi's life faces an even worse situation. The events which occur next form the climax of the story.

Cast 
 Piyali as Mayurakshi
 Swaraj as Ujan
 Anamika Saha
 Mrinal Mukherjee
 Bodhisatya Majumder
 Arun Banerjee

References 

Bengali-language Indian films
2010s Bengali-language films